Alfred Moffat may refer to:

 Alf Moffat (1870–1956), Australian sportsman
 Alfred Edward Moffat (1863–1950), Scottish musician